The First Battle of Deep Bottom, also known as Darbytown, Strawberry Plains, New Market Road, or Gravel Hill,  was fought July 27–29, 1864, at Deep Bottom in Henrico County, Virginia, as part of the Siege of Petersburg of the American Civil War. A Union force under Maj. Gens. Winfield S. Hancock and Philip H. Sheridan was sent on an expedition threatening Richmond, Virginia, and its railroads, intending to attract Confederate troops away from the Petersburg defensive line, in anticipation of the upcoming Battle of the Crater. The Union infantry and cavalry force was unable to break through the Confederate fortifications at Bailey's Creek and Fussell's Mill and was withdrawn, but it achieved its desired effect of momentarily reducing Confederate strength at Petersburg.

Background
It was a convenient crossing point from the Bermuda Hundred area on the south side of the river.

Lt. Gen. Ulysses S. Grant began a siege of the city of Petersburg, Virginia, after initial assaults on the Confederate lines, June 15–18, 1864, failed to break through. While Union cavalry conducted the Wilson-Kautz Raid (June 22 – July 1) in an attempt to cut the railroad lines leading into Petersburg, Grant and his generals planned a renewed assault on the Petersburg fortifications, an attack scheduled for July 30 that would become known as the Battle of the Crater. Hoping to increase the chances for success at Petersburg, Grant planned a movement against Richmond that Gen. Robert E. Lee would likely counter with troops taken out of the Petersburg line.

Grant ordered the II Corps of the Army of the Potomac, commanded by Maj. Gen. Winfield S. Hancock, and two divisions of Maj. Gen. Philip H. Sheridan's Cavalry Corps to cross the river to Deep Bottom by pontoon bridge and advance against the Confederate capital. A division of the X Corps (Army of the James), commanded by Brig. Gen. Robert S. Foster, had previously crossed on a second pontoon bridge just upstream to secure a bridgehead on the north bank of the river. Grant's plan called for Hancock to pin down the Confederates at Chaffin's Bluff and prevent reinforcements from opposing Sheridan's cavalry, which would attack Richmond if practicable. If not—a circumstance Grant considered more likely—Sheridan was ordered to ride around the city to the north and west and cut the Virginia Central Railroad, which was supplying Richmond from the Shenandoah Valley.

The Confederate fieldworks protecting Richmond were commanded by Lt. Gen. Richard S. Ewell. When Lee found out about Hancock's pending movement, he ordered that the Richmond lines be reinforced to 16,500 men. The four brigades of Maj. Gen. Joseph B. Kershaw's division joined Col. John S. Fulton's brigade of the Department of Richmond and the brigades of Brig. Gens. James H. Lane and Samuel McGowan from Maj. Gen. Cadmus M. Wilcox's division. The reinforcements moved east on New Market Road (present-day Virginia State Route 5) and took up positions on the eastern face of New Market Heights.

Opposing forces

Union

Confederate

Battle

July 27

Hancock and Sheridan crossed the pontoon bridge starting at 3 a.m., July 27. The II Corps advanced with the division of Maj. Gen. John Gibbon on the left, Brig. Gen. Francis C. Barlow in the center, and Brig. Gen. Gershom Mott on the right. They broke through the Confederate rifle pits on the New Market Road, captured four cannons, and continued to advance towards the Long Bridge Road. After being distracted by Confederate artillery fire, which Mott's infantry was able to suppress, the II Corps took up positions on the east bank of Bailey's Creek, from New Market Road to near Fussell's Mill. Sheridan's cavalry rode to the high ground on the right, overlooking the millpond. The cavalry division of Brig. Gen. Alfred T. A. Torbert captured the high ground near Fussell's Mill, but they were counterattacked and driven back by the 10th and 50th Georgia Infantry regiments. The Confederate works on the west bank of Bailey's Creek were formidable and Hancock chose not to attack them, spending the rest of the day performing reconnaissance.

While Hancock was stymied at Bailey's Creek, Robert E. Lee began bringing up more reinforcements from Petersburg, reacting as Grant had hoped. He assigned Lt. Gen. Richard H. Anderson to take command of the Deep Bottom sector and sent in Maj. Gen. Henry Heth's infantry division and Maj. Gen. W.H.F. "Rooney" Lee's cavalry division. Troops were also hurriedly detailed from the Department of Richmond to help the man the trenches.

July 28
On the morning of July 28, Grant reinforced Hancock with a brigade of the XIX Corps, which freed up Gibbon's division from its position on the New Market Road to assist in an attack on the Confederate left. Sheridan's men attempted to turn the Confederate left with an advance against Gravel Hill, but their movement was disrupted by a Confederate attack. Three brigades—Lane's, McGowan's, and Kershaw's (his original brigade before he became division commander)—attacked Sheridan's right flank. The Union cavalrymen formed a battle line in which they were lying prone just beyond a shallow ridgeline. The Confederates charged over the crest and encountered heavy fire from the Union repeating carbines. Mounted Federals in Sheridan's reserve pursued and captured nearly 200 prisoners; the Confederates were able to capture a single Union cannon before withdrawing to their earthworks.

Aftermath
By the afternoon of July 28, Hancock had repositioned his divisions to ensure that his force could return to the Deep Bottom crossing point without interference. No further combat occurred and the expedition against Richmond and its railroads was terminated. Satisfied that the operation had distracted sufficient Confederate forces from his front, General Grant determined to proceed with the assault against the Crater on July 30. He ordered Hancock to send Mott's division to the Petersburg trenches that night so that the XVIII Corps could take up a position to support the assault. The remainder of the II Corps and the cavalry recrossed the James on July 31.

Union casualties at the First Battle of Deep Bottom were 488 (62 killed, 340 wounded, and 86 missing or captured); Confederate casualties were 679 (80 killed, 391 wounded, 208 missing or captured). The Second Battle of Deep Bottom would be conducted in essentially the same area, August 13–20, 1864.

Battlefield preservation

The Civil War Trust (a division of the American Battlefield Trust) and its partners have acquired and preserved  of the battlefield.

Notes

References
 Bonekemper, Edward H., III. A Victor, Not a Butcher: Ulysses S. Grant's Overlooked Military Genius. Washington, DC: Regnery, 2004. .
 Davis, William C., and the Editors of Time-Life Books. Death in the Trenches: Grant at Petersburg. Alexandria, VA: Time-Life Books, 1986. .
 Grant, Ulysses S. Personal Memoirs of U. S. Grant. 2 vols. Charles L. Webster & Company, 1885–86. .
 Horn, John. The Petersburg Campaign: June 1864 – April 1865. Conshohocken, PA: Combined Publishing, 1999. .
 Kennedy, Frances H., ed. The Civil War Battlefield Guide. 2nd ed. Boston: Houghton Mifflin Co., 1998. .
 Salmon, John S. The Official Virginia Civil War Battlefield Guide. Mechanicsburg, PA: Stackpole Books, 2001. .
 National Park Service battle description

External links
 Battle of First Deep Bottom: Maps, histories, photos, and preservation news (CWPT)

Deep Bottom I
Deep Bottom I
Deep Bottom I
Deep Bottom I
Deep Bottom
Deep Bottom
1864 in Virginia
July 1864 events